

Most attended pre-season game in history

115,301 is the all-time record. It was a preseason game between the defending champions Boston Red Sox and Los Angeles Dodgers on Saturday March 29, 2008 at the Los Angeles Memorial Coliseum.

Least attended game in history
The least attended game does not include games where stadia were closed by governmental authority.

The record was set on September 28, 1882, in game between the Troy Trojans and the Worcesters in Worcester, Massachusetts, which some reports had only six spectators attend.

As both clubs had been notified that they were being dropped from the National League, fans had very little interest in watching the lame-duck teams, especially on a day which the Boston Globe of September 29 (p.2) described as "bleak, cold and windy."

This record does not count games played behind closed doors by governmental authority. Games that were played as such included the April 29, 2015 game between the Baltimore Orioles and the Chicago White Sox at Oriole Park at Camden Yards, which was closed because of safety concerns surrounding the 2015 Baltimore protests, and the majority of the 2020 season (only the NLCS and World Series had spectators) which was closed to fans due to the COVID-19 pandemic in 2020.

Highest and lowest (since 1903, excluding the 1918, 1981, 2020, and 2021) season home totals, by team

The highest per game attendance average is held by the Colorado Rockies in 1994 with 57,570 for 57 home games at Mile High Stadium during the strike shortened season.

The 1918 season is excluded as it was shortened due to travel restrictions caused by World War I.

The 1981 season is excluded due to the players' strike that cancelled almost two months' worth of games.

The 2020 and 2021 seasons are excluded due to the COVID-19 pandemic that caused restrictions on public gatherings.

4 million or more home attendance totals
Toronto Blue Jays became the first team in baseball history to draw 4 million mark in attendance in 1991 season.

Progression of the home field attendance record

Highest and lowest attendance by season

Largest crowds at a World Series game

References

Attendance